Nicolas Aquilino (born January 4, 1953) is a retired Filipino light-middleweight boxer. He won bronze medals at the 1970 and 1974 Asian Games and competed at the 1972 Olympics, where he was eliminated in the first bout.

1972 Olympic results
Below is the record of Nicolas Aquilino, a Filipinio light middleweight boxer who competed at the 1972 Munich Olympics:

 Round of 32: lost to Evengelos Oikonomakos (Greece) by decision, 0-5

References

External links
 

1953 births
Living people
Boxers at the 1972 Summer Olympics
Olympic boxers of the Philippines
Filipino male boxers
Medalists at the 1970 Asian Games
Medalists at the 1974 Asian Games
Asian Games bronze medalists for the Philippines
Boxers at the 1970 Asian Games
Boxers at the 1974 Asian Games
Asian Games medalists in boxing
Light-middleweight boxers